Centrolepis fascicularis is a species of plant in the Restionaceae family.

References

fascicularis